Jean Cowan (born 1947) is an American Democratic politician who served in the Oregon House of Representatives from 2007 until 2013.

Career
Cowan served as city councillor and mayor of Elgin, and then as a Lincoln County Commissioner for 12 years, and served on many state advisory bodies. She was elected to the Oregon House of Representatives in 2006. Cowan was chair of the Veterans and Emergency Services Committee during the 75th Assembly, and co-chair of the Natural Resources Subcommittee during the 76th Assembly. In November 2011, Cowan announced she would not seek reelection to her seat, and was succeeded by fellow Democrat David Gomberg.

References

Living people
1947 births
Democratic Party members of the Oregon House of Representatives
Women state legislators in Oregon
County commissioners in Oregon
Marylhurst University alumni
Politicians from Astoria, Oregon
People from Newport, Oregon
Oregon city council members
21st-century American politicians
21st-century American women politicians
Women city councillors in Oregon